

This is a list of the National Register of Historic Places listings in Brown County, South Dakota.

This is intended to be a complete list of the properties and districts on the National Register of Historic Places in Brown County, South Dakota, United States. The locations of National Register properties and districts for which the latitude and longitude coordinates are included below, may be seen in a map.

There are 46 properties and districts listed on the National Register in the county.  Another property was once listed but has since been removed

Current listings

|}

Former listing

|}

See also

 List of National Historic Landmarks in South Dakota
 National Register of Historic Places listings in South Dakota

References

 
Brown County
Buildings and structures in Brown County, South Dakota